Roman Yevhenovych Rusanovskyi (born 8 October 1972 in Kalush) is a former Ukrainian football player.

References

External links
 

1972 births
People from Kalush, Ukraine
Living people
Soviet footballers
FC Ros Bila Tserkva players
FC Spartak Ivano-Frankivsk players
Ukrainian footballers
Ukrainian Premier League players
Ukrainian First League players
Ukrainian Second League players
Ukrainian Amateur Football Championship players
FC Khutrovyk Tysmenytsia players
FC Chernomorets Novorossiysk players
Russian Premier League players
Ukrainian expatriate footballers
Expatriate footballers in Russia
Ukrainian expatriate sportspeople in Russia
FC Kalush players
FC Mariupol players
FC Enerhetyk Burshtyn players
Association football defenders
Sportspeople from Ivano-Frankivsk Oblast